Illumine Lingao, also known as Morning Star of Lingao, is a Chinese chuanyue (time travel) novel co-written by Xiao Feng under the pen name "Boaster".  The novel was originally published online in 2009 on Qidian Chinese Network.  The first print volume was published by China Radio, Film & TV Press in 2017.

Plot 
In the story, more than 500 people from early-21st-century China intentionally travel back in time via wormhole to the Chongzhen-era late Ming dynasty in 1628 AD.  Settling in Lingao County on the island of Hainan, the time travelers set out to establish an industrialized society and change the course of history.

Publication history 
The novel originates from an online BBS discussion started in the year 2006, about how time travelers can survive and change the history by using modern technologies. With permission, Xiao Feng, as one of the members of that BBS, collected the ideas by netizens of various educational backgrounds shawn in the discussion, and adapted them for a chuanyue novel.  After several unsuccessful attempts of writing the novel by Xiao and the others, he eventually began to published the novel online in 2009, and then updated the chapters slowly. In the years after the first part was released, he continued to collect fan works written by more and more readers of the novel, and adapted them into the new chapters. In 2017, the first volume of a revised version by Xiao himself was published, with more printed sequels rumored to be on the way.

Responses and influence 
From the 2010s, Illumine Lingao became an increasingly concerned work in China's Internet literature studies for its collective and collaborative style of writing, and for its detailed descriptions of the proto-industrialized "new world" built by the time travelers.  The novel is praised as the "encyclopedia of time travel" among readers.  Some critics also call it "a unique phenomenon of contemporary Chinese literature".

Illumine Lingao has some similarities with the 1632 series by Eric Flint.  But no evidence has shown that the latter work had significant influence on it.

Xiao Feng and some of the major fan work writers have held (or participate in) some fan conventions in real life, including a 2017 lecture given by Xiao in Beijing University.

Fans of the book later cultivated a subculture and political ideology, namingly "Industrial Party".

References

External links 

Official Site of Illumine Lingao (in Chinese)

Novels set in the Ming dynasty
Chinese science fiction novels
Novels about time travel
Chinese alternate history novels
Fiction set in the 17th century
Collaborative novels
Novels set in Hainan
2009 Chinese novels